Denial Esports (previously stylized as Denial eSports) was a professional esports organization based in the United States. They were most well known for their Call of Duty team being 2015 world champions, having won the Call of Duty Championship 2015.

Former Infinity Ward development lead Robert Bowling bought the team on January 14, 2016.

In September 2017, the organization went inactive and their website went down due to issues paying players and staff. The organization later resumed operations, but was dissolved on 31 May 2019.

Call of Duty

Roster

Tournament results 
 1st — Call of Duty Championship 2015	
 2nd — ESWC Zénith 2015
 2nd — MLG World Finals 2015

Counter-Strike: Global Offensive

Roster

Heroes of Newerth 
Denial's Heroes of Newerth squad got 2nd at DreamHack Winter 2013 with a squad of Pontus "Zlapped" Mähler, David "Probusk" Busk, Dennis "Flensmeister" Brofalk, Micke "m'ICKe" Nguyen, Son "VnSensation" Nguyen. Rezzy, captain of Hotti Gaming, kicked DozenthEagle. Rezzys statement on the situation was "As team captain of HOTTI and the rest of the team have decided to kick DozenthEgale from the team due to him being very disrespectful towards other teammates as well as he has been dragging the team down with his mood swings so we wish him the best of luck" Dozenth also responded in the comments by saying, "POV: you have terrible social skills"

Paladins

Former 
 Zach "Shadeey" Shades" Gilbert (Damage)
 Steven "Awry" Michalec (Support)
 Chris "Bitey" Mohn (Flex, Captain)
 David "Stolzey" Mathis (Damage)
 Noah "W1fL" Mathis (Tank)
 "PrinceDannyTv" (Flank)
 Kamlin “Kenzo” Subido Dunn (Tank)
 Bryce "Vex30" Kelly (Support)
 Cornslays (Coach)
 Hawker2255 (Flex)

Fighting game players

Former 
 Chris Tatarian (Street Fighter V)
 Mike "Danke" Schiller (Ultimate Marvel vs. Capcom 3, BlazBlue)
 Ernesto "Dios X" Ojeda (Ultimate Marvel vs. Capcom 3)
 James "Duck" Ma (Super Smash Bros. Melee)
 Tyler "Marss" Martins (Super Smash Bros. for Wii U)
 Stone Nguyen (Ultimate Marvel vs. Capcom 3)
 Andrew "iCranKiesT" Mendizabal (Street Fighter V)

References

External links 
 
 

Call of Duty teams
Counter-Strike teams
Halo (franchise) teams
Smite (video game) teams
Former League of Legends Challenger Series teams
Esports teams based in the United States
Fighting game player sponsors
Super Smash Bros. player sponsors
Esports teams established in 2013
Esports teams disestablished in 2019
Defunct and inactive Overwatch teams
Tom Clancy's Rainbow Six Siege teams
Defunct and inactive Super Smash Bros. player sponsors